is a Japanese volleyball player who plays for NEC Red Rockets.

Profiles
Her father was a volleyball player of NEC.

Clubs
MatsumotoShonan High School → NEC Red Rockets (2008-)

National team
 - 2008 (The 1st AVC Women's Cup)

References

External links
Red Rockets Officialsite

Japanese women's volleyball players
NEC Red Rockets players
Living people
1989 births
People from Matsumoto, Nagano